Disaster Management Bureau is a government bureau that manages government responses to natural disasters in Bangladesh and is located in Dhaka, Bangladesh.

History
The Disaster Management Bureau by Ministry of Disaster Management and Relief in 1993. Following the 1991 Bangladesh cyclone and floods in Bangladesh, the government felt a need for a dedicated bureau to manage relief operations in the country. The bureau is headed by a Director General.

References

Government agencies of Bangladesh
1993 establishments in Bangladesh
Organisations based in Dhaka
Emergency services in Bangladesh